Leslie Samuel Greenberg (born 30 September 1945) is a Canadian psychologist born in Johannesburg, South Africa, and is one of the originators and primary developers of Emotion-Focused Therapy for individuals and couples. He is a professor emeritus of psychology at York University in Toronto, and also director of the Emotion-Focused Therapy Clinic in Toronto. His research has addressed questions regarding empathy, psychotherapy process, the therapeutic alliance, and emotion in human functioning.

Greenberg studied engineering and worked as an engineer before earning his Ph.D. in psychology from York University in 1975. With his mentor Laura North Rice, who had studied with Carl Rogers at the University of Chicago, he began doing psychotherapy process research, attempting to mathematically model therapist–client interactions and using techniques of task analysis. He was also influenced early in his career by Juan Pascual-Leone's neo-Piagetian constructivist model of mind. His first academic position was at the University of British Columbia in counseling psychology, and he completed an externship at the Mental Research Institute in California in 1981. Initially trained in a client-centered therapy approach, he then trained in Gestalt therapy and over the years was exposed to many other approaches including systemic-interactional, psychodynamic and cognitive therapy. He returned to York University in 1986 as professor of psychology.

Greenberg has published numerous articles and co-authored the major books on emotion-focused approaches to psychotherapy. He is a founding member of the Society for the Exploration of Psychotherapy Integration (SEPI) and a past president of the Society for Psychotherapy Research (SPR), from which he received the Distinguished Research Career Award in 2004. The Canadian Psychological Association awarded him the Professional Award for Distinguished Contributions to Psychology as a Profession, and the American Psychological Association awarded him the APA Award for Distinguished Professional Contributions to Applied Research and the Carl Rogers Award. He has been on the editorial board of many psychotherapy journals, including the Journal of Clinical Psychology, Journal of Consulting and Clinical Psychology, Journal of Family Psychology, Journal of Marital & Family Therapy, Journal of Psychotherapy Integration and Psychotherapy Research.

Selected publications

Notes

External links
 
 

1945 births
Academic staff of York University
York University alumni
University of the Witwatersrand alumni
Canadian psychologists
South African psychologists
Living people
Constructivism (psychological school)
Gestalt therapy